Cedar Point is an amusement park in Sandusky, Ohio, in the United States.

Cedar Point may also refer to:

Places
Canada
Cedar Point, Ontario, one of two communities in Ontario
Cedar Point Provincial Park, named after the eponymous point on Quesnel Lake in British Columbia's Cariboo region

United States
Cedar Point, Illinois
Cedar Point, Kosciusko County, Indiana
Cedar Point, Kansas
Cedar Point, North Carolina
Cedar Point (Elkin, North Carolina), listed on the National Register of Historical Places in Surry County, North Carolina
Cedar Point County Park, East Hampton, New York
Cedar Point State Park, Cape Vincent, New York

See also
Cedar Point Light (disambiguation)
Cedar Point National Wildlife Refuge, Ohio
Cedar Point Nursery v. Hassid, a 2021 United States Supreme Court case involving eminent domain